Graham Township is a township in Graham County, Kansas, USA.  As of the 2000 census, its population was 53.

Geography
According to the USGS, it contains one cemetery, Roscoe.

References
 USGS Geographic Names Information System (GNIS)

External links
 US-Counties.com
 City-Data.com

Townships in Graham County, Kansas
Townships in Kansas